= Journal of Dermatology =

The Journal of Dermatology is a peer-reviewed medical journal covering dermatology published by the Japanese Dermatological Association (日本皮膚科学会 Nihon Hifuka Gakkai) and the Asian Dermatological Association. Its 2014 impact factor is 2.252.
